Washington Township is a township in Grundy County, in the U.S. state of Missouri.

Washington Township was established in 1841.

References

Townships in Missouri
Townships in Grundy County, Missouri